Adam Abdullah Al-Ilory (1917-1992) was a Nigerian Islamic scholar. He was born into the family of Abdul Baqi al-Ilory in ilorin, who was the son of Abdullah.

A Maliki scholar and the author of several books in the Arabic language, he was a Sufi ascetic in the Qadiriyya order. He founded the Arabic and Islamic Training Centre in Agege, a suburb of Lagos, Nigeria, in 1952, from which generations of Qur'anic exegetes originated.

His writings

Some of his works include:
 Aseem Soba (Morning Breeze)
 Markaz Talimil Arabiy (Markhaz Center for Arabic Language Learning)
 Ali Heedu Al'Arbahuna (Markhaz Center, 40 years old, 1985)
 Aslu Koba il Yoruba (History of the Yoruba People)
 El Islam Fi Naijiriyya (Islam in Nigeria)
 Lamhada fi Barul al Ulama al-Ilory (Overview of the Scientists of the City of Ilorin)
 Attarulilemi Watasowuf (Role of Science and Sufism in Islam)
 Dahoru Tasowuwasofiyat (Purpose of Sufism)
 Niusomtahalim Arabiy Wahlislamiy (Guide to Learning Islam and the Arabic Language)
 Ukukuli Hinsanni (Human Rights)
 Al Islamdinu Wadaholat (Islam and Government)
 Al Islam Watakolid Jahili (Islam and the black race)

Establishment of Arabic and Islamic Training Centre  (Markaz Agege)

The education provided at Al-llory's centre used modern teaching methods. For instance, it was in Markaz that the use of chalk and blackboard for teaching Arabic and Islamic education was first introduced in Southwest Nigeria. Hitherto, the teaching instruments were wooden slates and local ink. It was in Markaz that a curriculum was first introduced which classified studies into subjects while pupils were distributed into classrooms according to their levels. It was in Markaz that pupils of Arabic and Islamic education first wore uniforms and sat on chairs rather than on a bare floor, while writing with pencil or pen in notebooks. It was in Markaz that written examination was first conducted as a means of assessing and promoting pupils from class to class while certificates were issued to successful madrasah graduates as a measure of their level of education. It was in Markaz that such facilities as dormitories, library, printing press and clinic were first provided for students.

First graduation ceremony

With the first graduation ceremony of Markaz in 1957, Adam won a landmark victory for his methods. Following that graduation, some ambitious local Alfas enrolled in Markaz as students to improve their knowledge and undergo tutelage in the modern teaching methodology.

References

1917 births
1992 deaths
Muslim writers
Date of birth missing
Date of death missing
Nigerian Arabic poets
Yoruba Muslim leaders